Events from the year 1991 in Denmark.

Incumbents
 Monarch – Margrethe II
 Prime minister – Poul Schlüter

Events

Undated

The arts

Architecture

Film
 May – Lars von Trier's film Eyropa wins the Prix du Jury at the 44th Cannes Film Festival.

Literature

Music

Sports

Badminton
 28 May The 1991 IBF World Championships takes place in Copenhagen.
Denmark wins one silver medal and two bronze medals.

Cycling
 23 March – Rolf Sørensen comes in second in the Milan–San Remo road cycling race in Italy.
 7 April – Rolf Sørensen comes in 3rd in the Tour of Flanders.
 April 21 – Rolf Sørensen comes in 3rd in the Liège–Bastogne–Liège road cycling race.
 September – Brian Holm wins the Paris–Brussels road cycling race.
  Danny Clark (AUS) and Jens Veggerby (DEN) win the Six Days of Copenhagen sox-day track cycling race.

Swimming
 18–25 Augus  Denmark wins four gold medals and two bronze medals at the 1991 European Aquatics Championships.

Other
 August 31 – Jan O. Pedersen wins the 1991 Individual Speedway World Championship.

Births
 9 January – Søren Hess-Olesen, tennis player
 15 January – Nicolai Jørgensen, footballer
 3 September – Thomas Delaney, footballer
 4 October – Nicolai Kielstrup, singer

Deaths
12 March – William Heinesen, poet, writer, composer and painter from the Faroe Islands (born 1900)
8 August – Ada Bruhn Hoffmeyer, medieval weapons expert (born 1910)

See also
1991 in Danish television

References

 
Denmark
Years of the 20th century in Denmark
1990s in Denmark
Denmark